Operation Jackpot Nalli C.I.D 999 is a 1969 Indian Kannada-language spy thriller film directed and produced by Dorai–Bhagavan. It stars Rajkumar, Narasimharaju and Rekha.

The film is the third in the CID 999 franchise, created along the lines of the James Bond and James Bond-styled films, with the first two being Jedara Bale & Goa Dalli CID 999. The success of this movie led to one more sequel - Operation Diamond Racket. This was the debut movie of actress Rekha in a lead role.

With the release of this movie, CID 999 became the first character based trilogy movie in India. This movie was praised for its angled lighting, clever use of shadows and well thought out decor such as the atmospheric arches in the lair - all of which added an element of noir to the movie.

Premise 
CID 999 aka Prakash is assigned to investigate about a nuclear scientist named Shekar, who created a formula named Plasma Binson, which is used to destroy any object in earth, and destroy the formula from getting into wrong hands. How does Prakash destroy the formula forms the crux of the plot.

Cast
 Rajkumar as CID 999 Prakash
 Rekha as Mona
 Narasimharaju as CID 888 Baby
 Surekha

Soundtrack

References

External links
 
 

1969 films
1960s Kannada-language films
Films scored by G. K. Venkatesh
Indian action thriller films
Indian spy thriller films
1960s action thriller films
1960s spy thriller films
Films directed by Dorai–Bhagavan